Dr. Dirk Spennemann, an Australian cultural heritage academic, is an Associate Professor in Cultural Heritage Management at the School of Environmental Sciences, Charles Sturt University in Albury, New South Wales, Australia. His main research interest rests in the area of futures studies focussing on heritage futures by examining issues such as the conceptual understanding of emergent heritage(s), the recognition of heritage sites and objects of future heritage value such as Space Heritage and Robotics; and the relationship between cultural heritage values and the influences of management processes as they play out between heritage professionals and the general public.

Biography
Spennemann is the recipient of the  Governor's Humanities Award for Excellence in Research and Publication, Commonwealth of the Northern Mariana Islands (2004) and the Partnership Steward Ship Award for Cultural Resources, Pacific West Region, US National Park Service (2001) as well as the Vice Chancellor's Award for Research Excellence, Charles Sturt University  (1996) and the Vice Chancellor's Award for Teaching Excellence, Charles Sturt University (1995).

Spennemann is a member of the Association of Professional Futurists, the World Futures Studies Federation, the World Futures Society, the British Interplanetary Society and Australia ICOMOS. Spennemann is the editor of the journals  Studies in German Colonial Heritage (ISSN 1834-7797)  and  Studies in Contemporary and Emergent Heritage (ISSN 1834-4208) and a co-editor of the Micronesian Journal of the Humanities and Social Sciences (ISSN 1449-7336).

Selected publications
 Space Heritage: 
 The ethics of treading on Neil Armstrongs footsteps (2004)
 The Naval heritage of project Apollo (2005)
 Heritage sites of the US Space Program in Australia (2005, with Linda Kosmer)
 Out of this world (2006)
 Technological heritage on Mars (2007, with Guy Murphy)
 Extreme Cultural Tourism (in press)
Heritage Futures & Robotics: 
 On the cultural heritage of robots (2007)
 Of Great Apes and Robots (2007),
Space Tourism: 
 Orbital, Lunar and Interplanetary Tourism (in press)
Conference Papers:
 Technological heritage on Mars (Paris) (2006, with Guy Murphy)
 SpaceScapes: Past, Present and Future Extraterrestrial Landscapes in the Human Imagination (Caen, France) (2007)
 Orbital, Lunar and Interplanetary Tourism: Opportunities for Different Perspectives in Star Tourism (La Palma, Spain) (2007)

Space-related publications (or their abstracts) can be accessed via the SpaceArchaeology Wiki

See also
 Dirk HR Spennemann - official site

References 

Living people
Futurologists
Australian archaeologists
Academic staff of Charles Sturt University
Australian philatelists
Year of birth missing (living people)